Majhergram railway station is part of the Kolkata Suburban Railway system and operated by Eastern Railway. It is located on the Bangaon–Ranaghat line in Nadia district in the Indian state of West Bengal.

Layout

See also

References

External links 

 Majhergram Station Map

Sealdah railway division
Kolkata Suburban Railway stations
Railway stations in Nadia district